Wong Kam Kau (born 13 September 1978) is a fencer from Hong Kong, China who won a bronze medal at the 2006 Asian Games in the men's foil team competition.

References

Living people
1978 births
Hong Kong male foil fencers
Place of birth missing (living people)
Asian Games medalists in fencing
Fencers at the 1998 Asian Games
Fencers at the 2002 Asian Games
Fencers at the 2006 Asian Games
Asian Games bronze medalists for Hong Kong
Medalists at the 2006 Asian Games
20th-century Hong Kong people
21st-century Hong Kong people